Pro FM is a radio station in Romania and Moldova, it broadcasts in Romanian language. It was sold by Central European Media Enterprises to RCS & RDS in 2014.

Affiliated stations 
  Hateg - Radio T5          93.9 MHz
  Piatra Neamt - Radio Unu  92.0 MHz
  Galati - Radio Lider Fm  92.4 MHz
  Tulcea - Radio Delta          95.8 MHz
  Turda - Radio Turda         107.7 MHz
  Vaslui - Smile Fm          93,1 MHz

References

External links
 
ProFM Romania - Radio Online Live

Radio stations in Romania
Romanian-language radio stations
Romanian-language radio stations in Moldova